The 2020 Mid-Eastern Athletic Conference women's basketball tournament was a postseason college basketball tournament that was scheduled to take place March 10–14, 2020, at the Norfolk Scope in Norfolk, Virginia. The first-round games were played on March 11 and March 12, and the quarterfinal games were to be played on March 13 and 14. The semifinals were to be held on March 15, with the championship game on March 16. The winner of the tournament would have receive a first-round bid to the 2020 NCAA Tournament. On March 12, the NCAA announced that the tournament was cancelled due to the coronavirus pandemic. That decision, which came with under two minutes remaining in Morgan State's eventual 64-63 quarterfinal win over Delaware State, meant that game became the final college basketball game, men's or women's, played that season, and ultimately the final NCAA-sponsored event of the 2019–20 school year.

Seeds 
Only 10 of the 11 teams are eligible for the tournament.

Teams are seeded by record within the conference, with a tiebreaker system to seed teams with identical conference records.

Schedule

Bracket

References

2019–20 Mid-Eastern Athletic Conference women's basketball season
MEAC women's basketball tournament
Basketball competitions in Norfolk, Virginia
MEAC women's basketball tournament
College basketball tournaments in Virginia
Women's sports in Virginia